"The Other Side of Love" is a song by the British synth-pop band Yazoo, released in 1982 as their fourth single. The single peaked at #13 on the UK Singles Chart, making it the band's least successful single and the only one of their four singles to miss the top three in the UK. The track was written by band members Vince Clarke and Alison Moyet, and was originally not included on either of the band's albums (it was later added to a reissue of Upstairs at Eric's). It featured Stiff Records' all-female band Sylvia and the Sapphires on backing vocals following a chance meeting on the B.A. Robertson show.

The track was not included in the set-list for the duo's 2008 reunion tour. In an interview on the official Yazoo website Moyet explained: "We left out stuff that translated less well to live work. Personally I always thought "The Other Side of Love" was a bit wank. It is my least favourite track. I didn't like singing it and Vince was not bothered by it so we left it out."

The single's B-side is "Ode to Boy", which appeared on their second album You and Me Both. The cover's sleeve design was created by Moyet.

Reception
Neil Tennant, writing for Smash Hits, described the song as a "light pop offering" and felt it was "more closely related" to "Just Can't Get Enough" than "Don't Go". John Shearlaw of Record Mirror described the song as a "subtle grower and wonderfully skilful dive back into a smoky, twilit nightclub world."

Track listings 
 7" UK single (Mute YAZ 002)
 "The Other Side of Love" - 3:05
 "Ode to Boy" - 3:37

 12" UK single (Mute 12YAZ 002)
 "The Other Side of Love" (Remixed Extended Version) - 5:24
 "Ode to Boy" - 3:37

 CD (Mute CDYAZ2)
 "The Other Side of Love" - 3:05
 "Ode to Boy" - 3:37
 "The Other Side of Love (Remixed Extended Version) - 5:24

Chart performance

References

External links 
 Yazoo official site

1982 singles
Yazoo (band) songs
Songs written by Alison Moyet
Songs written by Vince Clarke
Song recordings produced by Eric Radcliffe
1982 songs
Mute Records singles
UK Independent Singles Chart number-one singles